Charles James "Jim" King (February 3, 1925 – February 21, 2016) was a politician in the American state of Florida. He served in the Florida House of Representatives from 1967 to 1970, representing the 89th district.

References

1925 births
2016 deaths
Members of the Florida House of Representatives